Logan Township is an inactive township in Reynolds County, in the U.S. state of Missouri.

Logan Township was erected in 1845, taking its name from James Logan, a pioneer citizen.

References

Townships in Missouri
Townships in Reynolds County, Missouri